A campaign manager, campaign chairman, or campaign director is a paid or volunteer individual whose role is to coordinate a political campaign's operations such as fundraising, advertising, polling, getting out the vote (with direct contact to the public), and other activities supporting the effort, directly.

Apart from the candidate, they are often a campaign's most visible leader. However, modern campaign managers, particularly at the presidential level, are mostly concerned with executing strategy, not setting it. The senior strategists are typically outside political consultants, primarily pollsters and media consultants.

Particularly for large, well-funded campaigns, campaign managers often manage a huge number of staffers and volunteers in a variety of departments, while also coordinating closely with the candidate and outside consultants. 

In the United States, increasingly, campaign management has been a speciality occupation. The top-tier of managers will move throughout the country working on a different campaign each election cycle.  The challenges of building a successful operation from scratch in less than 2 years makes experienced professionals increasingly valuable.

In addition to their past experience, experienced campaign managers also bring with them knowledge of campaign management tools and relationships with political consultants.

The pay ranges for a campaign manager differ depending on the scale of the political race.

Elections